was a town located in Nishikanbara District, Niigata Prefecture, Japan. Bunsui is now a part of the expanded city of Tsubame.

As of April 1, 2005, the town had an estimated population of 15,130. The total area was 39.61 km².

On March 20, 2006, Bunsui, along with the town of Yoshida (also from Nishikanbara District), was merged into the expanded city of Tsubame.

The town plays host to the annual Spring Oiran Dochu festival.

Transportation

Railway
  JR East - Echigo Line

Highway
 

Dissolved municipalities of Niigata Prefecture
Tsubame, Niigata